Deshan may refer to:

Places 
 , a township in Fangzheng County, Heilongjiang, China
 , an area in  Wuling District, Changde, Hunan, China

People with the name 
 Deshan Dias (born 1992), Sri Lankan cricketer
 Deshan Fernando (born 1998), Sri Lankan cricketer
 Deshan Withanage (born 1997), Sri Lankan cricketer
 Deshan Xuanjian (780s–865), Chinese Zen Buddhist monk
 Liao Deshan (1866–1923), Chinese educator
 Nipuna Deshan (born 1999), Sri Lankan cricketer

See also 
 Deshan Mikitbo, or Matis, an ethnic group of the Amazon
 Hotal Deshan, a village in Pakistan
 Dechamps
 Duchamp (disambiguation)